Sir Howell Jones Williams DL JP (died 13 August 1939), was a Welsh Progressive politician and a prominent London builder. He represented Islington South on the London County Council from 1898 to 1925.

Background
Williams was born in Marioneth, Wales, but spent his adult life in London. He was a prominent builder and city council member. Williams success in London did not remove him from his Welsh roots. He was an active member of the London Welsh community; this is highlighted by his 1923-1924 presidency of the London Welsh Trust. Additionally, he acted as the Sheriff of Merionethshire in 1917.

Williams was married and had three sons.

His sons were Howell Williams (circa 1895), Captain Arthur Ifor Meakin Williams (1895 - 9 October 1918), Meyrick Richard M Williams (1900 - 1967)

Building
Some of the more noteworthy buildings constructed by Williams are the Daily Mail and Evening News Offices on the Thames Embankment, Rotherhithe Town Hall, and a substantial number of buildings along Gray's Inn Road. Of particular note are buildings for the Benchers of Gray's Inn and the London Welsh Centre.

The London Welsh Centre was built on a 15,000 square foot lot that Williams purchased for this purpose. Upon completion of the building, he gifted it to the Young Wales Association for their use.

While not constructed directly by Williams, the David's Wing of the Royal Northern Hospital was built with donations from Williams. With donations of £158,000, Williams was the hospitals largest benefactor. The building has since been demolished but a memorial wall of plaques remains; one of these plaques recognizes Williams' contribution to the building.

Political career
Williams was Progressive candidate for the Rotherhithe division of Southwark, at a by-election on 31 March 1894. He was elected to the London County Council (LCC), holding the seat for the party. He served until the full elections in 1895. He was Progressive candidate for the Islington South division at the 1898 LCC elections. He was elected, holding the seat for the party. He was re-elected for Islington South at the next seven elections. He was a Justice of the Peace in the County of London. He was a Deputy Lieutenant and served as High Sheriff of Merionethshire from 1917–18. He was knighted in 1921. He was Deputy Chairman of the London County Council in 1921.

Electoral record

References

1939 deaths
Progressive Party (London) politicians
High Sheriffs of Merionethshire